The Pont Serme or Pons Selinus, later called the Pons Septimus, was a Roman bridge of the Via Domitia in Hérault, southern France. The approximately 1500 m long viaduct crossed the wide marshes of the Orb and the Etang de Capestang west of Béziers, surpassing in length even the Trajan's Bridge over the Danube. Today, few traces remain of the viaduct, other than its name, which has passed over to a nearby village.

See also 
 List of Roman bridges
 Roman architecture
 Roman engineering

Notes

Sources

External links 
Pictures of the Marches of Capestang once crossed by the Pont Serme Archived from the original on 2007-09-29.

Roman bridges in France
Buildings and structures in Hérault